Peytonsburg is an unincorporated community in Cumberland County, Kentucky, United States.

Geography
It lies along Route 61 south of the city of Burkesville, the county seat of Cumberland County, and almost on the Tennessee border.  Its elevation is 1,001 feet (305 m).

References

Unincorporated communities in Cumberland County, Kentucky
Unincorporated communities in Kentucky